History

In 1959 Davies and Connelly introduced so called triaxiality factor, defined as the ratio of Cauchy stress first principal invariant divided by effective stress , cf. formula (35) in Davies and Conelly (1959). The  denotes first invariant of Cauchy stress tensor,  denote principal values of Cauchy stress,  denotes mean stress,  is second invariant of Cauchy stress deviator,  denote principal values of Cauchy stress deviator,  denotes effective stress.

Davies and Conelly were motivated in this proposal by supposition, correct in view of their own and later research, that negative pressure (spherical tension)  called by them rather exotically triaxial tension, has a strong influence on the loss of ductility of metals, and the need to have some parameter to describe this effect.

Wierzbicki et al (2005).

The triaxiality factor does not discern triaxial stress states from states of lower dimension.

Ziółkowski proposed to use as a measure of pressure towards shearing forces another modification of the index , not burdened with whatever strength effort hypothesis, in the form , cf. formula (8.2) in Ziółkowski (2022). In the context of material testing a reasonable mnemonic name for  could be, e.g. pressure index or pressure factor.

Stress Triaxiality factor in biaxial tests 

The triaxiality factor  gained considerable attention and popularity when Wierzbicki and his collaborators pointed out that not only pressure but also Lode angle  can considerably influence ductile fracture and other properties of metals, cf. e.g. Wierzbicki et al (2005).

The class of biaxial tests is defined by the condition that always one of the principal values of the stress tensor is equal to zero. In 2005 Wierzbicki and Xue found that in the class of biaxial tests a unique constraint relation exists between normalized principal third invariant of deviator and triaxiality factor in the form , cf. formula (23) in Wierzbicki et al (2005).

In presentation of material testing results, the most frequently at present, it is used so called Lode angle . The Lode angle is defined with the relation . However, the Lode angle  does not have clear (lucid) physical interpretation. From a mathematical standpoint, the Lode angle describes the angle between projection of Cauchy stress  on the octahedral plane and projection of the greatest principal stress  on the octahedral plane.

Ziółkowski proposed to use a skewness angle  defined with the following relation ,  for characterization of mode of shearing forces, cf. formula (4.2) in Ziółkowski (2022). The skewness angle  has several cogent and useful physical-statistical interpretations. It describes the departure of the actual Cauchy stress deviator  from the corresponding reference pure shear , i.e., deviator with the same modulus as   but with third invariant equal to zero .

In micromechanical context the skewness angle can be understood as a macroscopic measure of the magnitude of internal entropy of the (macroscopic) Cauchy stress tensor. In this sense that its value determines degree of order of the population of micro pure shears (directional dipoles) generating the specific macroscopic stress state. The smaller is absolute values of skewness angle the smaller is internal entropy of Cauchy stress tensor.

The skewness angle enters as a parameter in a measure of anisotropy factor (degree) of stress tensor, which can be expressed with the formula , cf. formula (4.5) in Ziółkowski (2022). The formula elucidates that the greater is internal order of pure shears population generating specific macroscopic stress state, i.e. the lower its entropy, the larger is anisotropy of the macroscopic stress tensor.

The isotropy angle enables extraction of the spherical (isotropic) part and deviatoric (anisotropic) part of the stress tensor in a very straightforward and convenient manner.

The measure of tensor anisotropy , introduced by Rychlewski (1985) and actually applicable to tensors of any degree, is defined with the formula , . 

The  denotes diameter of tensor orbit defined as follows, where  denotes distance generated by the usual tensorial norm ,  is any second order proper orthogonal (rotation) tensor . The diameter of tensor orbit is simply a maximum distance between any two members in the orbit of a tensor .

A very simple (linear) connection exists between Lode angle and skewness angle .

The Wierzbicki's constraint relation , valid for biaxial stress states can be solved with respect to skewness angle to obtain the following explicit relations linking triaxiality factor and skewness angle, cf. Ziółkowski (2022).

The above relations  are three bijections (one to one relations) in three sharing edges but otherwise separate subdomains, which altogether make the entire two parameter domain (half-plane) of biaxial tests stress states.The explicit reverse relations , easily obtainable from the above formulae, are very convenient for numerical computations, because they enable determination of the value of skewness (Lode) angle  (shearing mode of stress) only from the value of the triaxiality factor  without the necessity to compute determinant of stress deviator, what delivers large computational savings. Selection of the correct subformula is very easy because it can be decided only upon the value of  falling into a specific range of values. For example, when , then it belongs to the range ; hence .

The relations  allowed for formulation and proof of the following important theorems and Corrollary, cf. Ziółkowski (2022).

Theorem I. The radial lines (rays) coming out from the origin  of the coordinates frame of the biaxial tests domain, i.e., half-plane , are lines of constant values of triaxiality factor and at the same time, lines of constant values of skewness angle .

Theorem II.

Corollary. In the case of convex critical surface, with the aid of any type of biaxial (plane) stress test, for any fixed value of mean stress (pressure) , critical effective stress  can be determined for only a single value of the skewness (Lode) angle , and thus corresponding to it single value of triaxiality factor .

In the case of convex critical surface, with the aid of any type of biaxial (plane) stress test, for any fixed value of skewness (Lode) angle , critical effective stresses  can be determined for only three values of mean stress (pressure) , and thus three values of triaxiality factor  corresponding to  in three subdomains.

The Corrollary indicates for limitations of the class of biaxial (plane) tests in experimental examination of the influence of skewness (Lode) angle and pressure on materials behavior submitted to multiaxial loadings. This is so, because upon executing only biaxial tests no adequate experimental data results can be collected to reliably separate the influence of mean stress and/or skewness angle on the possible variations of critical effective stresses. One value of skewness angle for any fixed pressure and/or three values of pressure for any fixed skewness angle deliver skimpy information for such purpose.

Triaxialy factor as convenient indicator showing transition from two-dimensional (plane) stress to full three-dimensional state of stress 

Relations  valid for biaxial (plane) stress states show that in such a case, the values of the triaxiality factor must always remain in the range , while in the general case of three-dimensional multiaxial tests, the triaxiality factor can take any value from the range . In many experimental mechanics publications, in which results from biaxial tests are presented, values of triaxiality factor exceeding the two-third value can be encountered  which may seem to be incorrect. However, experimental observation of the triaxiality factor greater than  rather indicates that the biaxiality condition of the plane stress test was lost, and in the sample three-dimensional stress state started to exist, cf. Ziółkowski (2022).

Application examples 

Stress triaxiality has important applications in fracture mechanics and can often be used to predict the type of fracture (i.e. ductile or brittle) within the region defined by that stress state. A higher stress triaxiality corresponds to a stress state which is primarily hydrostatic rather than deviatoric. High stress triaxiality (> 2–3) promotes brittle cleavage fracture as well as dimple formation within an otherwise ductile fracture. Low stress triaxiality corresponds with shear slip and therefore larger ductility, as well as typically resulting in greater toughness. Ductile crack propagation is also influenced by stress triaxiality, with lower values producing steeper crack resistance curves. Several failure models such as the Johnson-Cook (J-C) fracture criterion (often used for high strain rate behavior),  Rice-Tracey model, and J-Q large scale yielding model incorporate stress triaxiality.

References 

Continuum mechanics